This is a list of entities and changes in The World Factbook. The World Factbook is an annual publication of the Central Intelligence Agency of the United States with almanac-style information about the countries of the world.

As of July 2011, The World Factbook consists of 267 entities.  These entities can be divided into categories. These categories are:

Independent countries
Others
Dependencies and Areas of Special Sovereignty
Miscellaneous
Other entities

After the list of entities, there is a table that lists entities that have been dropped, added, renamed, or consolidated in The World Factbook.

List of entities

The list of entities follows below. The names and flags of entities are as listed in the Factbook and may differ from other sources.

Independent countries 

This is a list of independent countries. The CIA defines an independent country as people "politically organized into a sovereign state with a definite territory". In this category, there are 195 entities:

Others 

This is a list of other places set apart from the list of independent countries. There are two entities in this category:

Dependencies and Areas of Special Sovereignty 
This category is a list of places affiliated with another country. They may be subdivided into categories using the country they are affiliated with:

Miscellaneous
This category is for Antarctica and places in dispute. There are five entities here:

Antarctica
Gaza Strip
Paracel Islands
Spratly Islands
West Bank

Other entities
This category is for the World and the oceans. There are five oceans and the World (the World entry is intended as a summary of the other entries ) :

Arctic Ocean
Atlantic Ocean
Indian Ocean
Pacific Ocean
Southern Ocean
World

Changes in The World Factbook

This table lists changes in the entities in the Factbook. Entities that have been added are in green; dropped entities are in red; the flag last used by the entity is shown as well. Entities that have changed their name are in blue; entities that have been redirected and consolidated into another entry are in purple.

Notes 

 These entities have been consolidated into the United States Pacific Island Wildlife Refuges entry.

 On April 27, 1992, Serbia and Montenegro, the final two republics of the Socialist Federal Republic of Yugoslavia (SFRY), formed a new nation, the Federal Republic of Yugoslavia (FRY). Until 2001, the U.S. Government did not recognize the FRY as a state. The U.S. government also decided not to accept the FRY or any the other republics as a successor state to the SFRY.

See also

The World Factbook

References

External links
The World Factbook website
 The World Factbook Change Log Detailed changes within the CIA's World Factbook

Entities
Lists of places
Central Intelligence Agency publications